Sriranjani is a ragam in Carnatic music (musical scale of South Indian classical music). It is a hexatonic scale (shadava rāgam, which means "of six"). It is a derived scale (janya rāgam), as it does not have all the seven swaras (musical notes). It is also written as Shri ranjani or Shree Ranjani. It also exist in Hindustani music, with a different scale. Aroh: Sa, komal Ga, Ma, Dha, komal Ni, Sa; Avroh: Sa, komal Ni, Dha, Ma, komal Ga, Ré, Sa.

Structure and Lakshana 

Shree ranjani is a symmetric scale that does not contain panchamam. It is called a shadava-shadava rāgam, in Carnatic music classification (as it has six notes in both ascending and descending scales). Its  structure is as follows (see swaras in Carnatic music for details on below notation and terms):

 : 
 : 

This scale uses the notes shadjam, chathusruti rishabham, sadharana gandharam, shuddha madhyamam, chathusruthi dhaivatham and kaisiki nishadam. Shree ranjani is a janya rāgam of Kharaharapriya, the 22nd Melakarta rāgam. It has only the invariant panchamam missing from its parent scale, Kharaharapriya.

Popular compositions 
Shree ranjani is a pleasing and popular rāgam. This scale has been used by many composers and there are many compositions in classical music. It has been used to score film music, too. Here are some popular compositions in Sriranjani.

Marubalka, Brochevarevare, Sari evvare, Bhuvini daasudane, and Sogasuga mrudanga talamu by Thyagaraja
Shri Dum durge, Balambikaya and parvata raja kumari by Muthuswami Dikshitar
Ini oru kanam unnai, Kaana Vendamo, Mata innum Vaatha and Gajavadana karuna by Papanasam Sivan
Srinivasa Enna Bittu ,Thaala beku  by Purandaradasa
Nadhamennum Kovilile by M S Viswanathan rendered by Vani Jayaram
Pagalile Oru Nilavinai Kanden by Ilayaraaja rendered by S. Janaki
Mukshika Vahanane by Manachanallur Giridharan rendered by Harini

Film Songs

Language: Tamil

Related rāgams 
This section covers the theoretical and scientific aspect of this rāgam.

Scale similarities 
Ābhōgi is a rāgam which does not have the kaisiki nishadam in both ascending and descending scales in comparison to Sriranjani. Its  structure is : 
Ragam Jayamanohari is a ragam which is like Abhogi in ascending scale and like Sriranjani is descending scale. Its  structure is :

Notes

References

Janya ragas